The 1884 Tennessee gubernatorial election was held on November 4, 1884. Incumbent Democrat William B. Bate defeated Republican nominee Frank T. Reid with 51.24% of the vote.

General election

Candidates
Major party candidates
William B. Bate, Democratic
Frank T. Reid, Republican 

Other candidates
(FNU) Buchanan, Greenback

Results

References

1884
Tennessee
Gubernatorial